Harispattuwe Ariyawanshalankara thero (1939 – 2014) was a Buddhist monk in Sri Lanka. He was popular as a pious monk who had delivered great service to both Buddhism and society in Sri Lanka.

Early life
He was born in the village of Maruddana as Dharmasena Ariyathilaka, in Kandy in 1939. his father was a businessman named Lamanige Jemis Sinho and his mother was Pathirajage Gunavathi, both from Harsipattuwa. His childhood was marked with poverty after the death of his father. He started his career as a teacher and retired in 1975. He became a Buddhist monk in Ramanna sect in the year 2000. He obtained a doctorate at the age of 74 from University of Kelaniya.

Service to Buddhism and society
He functioned as the chief incumbent of International Vipassana Meditation Center of Colombo for 13 years, through which meditation became popular among the Buddhist laymen. He appeared in popular television shows like Doramandalawa in dhamma discussions and delivered many dhamma sermons, which were popular among the people. Venerable Harispattuwe Ariyawanshalankara thero was also a philanthropist who had donated money he received for the benefit of the society rather than his own use. He died in 2014. The funeral was plainly held and even the money collected for the ceremony was used to construct a house for a needy family as the lastwill of thero before his death. He was also the chairman of Temperance Movement of Sri Lanka and has written several books on Buddhism.

References

Sri Lankan Buddhist monks
People from Kandy
1939 births
2014 deaths